Ma Po Mei is a village in Lam Tsuen, Tai Po District, Hong Kong.

Administration
Ma Po Mei is a recognized village under the New Territories Small House Policy.

References

External links

 Delineation of area of existing village Ma Po Mei (Tai Po) for election of resident representative (2019 to 2022)
 Antiquities Advisory Board. Historic Building Appraisal. Leung Ancestral Hall, Ma Po Mei Pictures

Villages in Tai Po District, Hong Kong
Lam Tsuen